Queen & Slim is a 2019 American romantic road crime drama film directed by Melina Matsoukas (in her feature directorial debut) and with a screenplay by Lena Waithe from a story by James Frey and Waithe. The film's tells the story of a young couple (Daniel Kaluuya and Jodie Turner-Smith) who go on the run after killing a police officer in the heat of an argument as self-defense during a traffic stop. Bokeem Woodbine, Chloë Sevigny, Flea, Sturgill Simpson and Indya Moore also star.

Queen & Slim had its world premiere at the AFI Fest on November 14, 2019, and was theatrically released in the United States on November 27, 2019, by Universal Pictures. It received positive reviews from critics, with praise for Kaluuya and Turner-Smith's lead performances, Matsoukas' direction and its overall theme and message. It grossed $47 million on a $20 million budget.

Plot
In 2019, after a client of hers is executed by the state, “Queen”, a black criminal defense attorney, has an awkward and disappointing dinner with her Tinder date “Slim“ in an Ohio diner. As he drives her home from what will be their one and only date, they are pulled over by a white police officer who searches Slim and his trunk without cause. When Slim mildly asks the officer to hurry as it is cold outside, the officer draws his gun on Slim. Queen angrily gets out to confront the officer, reaching for her phone, and he shoots her in the leg. Slim tackles the officer and a scuffle ensues, resulting in Slim grabbing the officer's gun and shooting him dead. Taking the gun and throwing away their phones, Queen tells Slim they must go on the run or else spend their lives in prison.

Out of gas, they flag down a passing Latino driver, Edgar, who turns out to be a Kentucky sheriff. He receives an APB about the officer's death and realizes Queen and Slim are the suspects. They take his truck at gunpoint, leaving him in the trunk of Slim's car, despite his offering to help them. They pay a young black boy to order them food, and he reveals that dashcam footage of their confrontation with the officer has gone viral. They accidentally strike the boy's father with the truck, but he is supportive of their actions — the police officer Slim shot having killed an unarmed black man two years earlier — and they drive him to a hospital. Slim has an unsettling encounter with a gas station clerk after letting him hold the gun.

They arrive in New Orleans at the house of Queen's estranged Uncle Earl, a pimp, and Slim proposes they escape to Cuba. After a police officer notices their truck, Earl gives them money and another car to reach Johnny Shepherd, a friend whose life he saved while serving overseas. Queen and Slim bond while dancing at a bar, where they are recognized by sympathetic locals, and stop to admire a horse by the road. Their car breaks down, forcing them to give all their money to a black mechanic, whose teenage son Junior expresses his admiration for them; Slim has Junior take their picture.

Slim calls his father, who cuts the call short; it is revealed that law enforcement was listening in, but his father refuses to cooperate. Queen takes Slim to visit the grave of her mother, who was accidentally killed by her Uncle Earl during a disagreement; Queen successfully defended him in her first trial. Slim comforts Queen, and they have sex in the car. At a protest in support of the fugitives, Junior is urged to leave by a compassionate black officer, whom he impulsively shoots in the face, and is himself killed.

Queen and Slim reach the home of Shepherd and his wife, who reveal that a $500,000 bounty has been placed on them, and Shepherd gives them directions to a man in Florida. A neighbor sees them arrive, and a SWAT team raids the house but fails to find them, hidden in a crawlspace under the Shepherds' bed. The next day, they sneak out of the house through a window and Queen dislocates her shoulder, which Slim resets, but her cry alerts a black officer stationed outside. He discovers them about to flee in the Shepherds' car but lets them escape.

They reach the Florida address and sleep in the car, awakened in the morning by a black man with a shotgun. They follow the man to his trailer where he makes a call, telling them a friend can help them escape by plane. He drives them to the tarmac and Queen and Slim walk toward a waiting plane, but a squad of police cars arrive on the scene. Joining hands, they declare their love for each other, but Queen is shot dead by an overeager officer. Ignoring police commands, an unarmed Slim carries Queen's body toward the officers and is gunned down as well.

The people Queen and Slim encountered react to news reports of their deaths; the Florida man has collected the bounty, while the police have falsely claimed that both Queen and Slim were armed when they were shot, despite footage showing the opposite. Their real names are revealed to be Angela Johnson and Ernest Hines, and hundreds attend their funeral, viewing them as martyrs as Junior's photo of them becomes a symbol across the country.

Cast

 Daniel Kaluuya as Ernest "Slim" Hines
 Jodie Turner-Smith as Angela "Queen" Johnson
 Bokeem Woodbine as Uncle Earl 
 Chloë Sevigny as Mrs. Shepherd
 Flea as Mr. Johnny Shepherd
 Sturgill Simpson as Police Officer Reed
 Indya Moore as Goddess
 Benito Martinez as Sheriff Edgar
 Jahi Di'Allo Winston as Junior
 Gralen Bryant Banks as Older Black Man
 Dickson Obahor as Large Black Man
 Bryant Tardy as Chubby
 Thom Gossom Jr. as Slim's Father
 Melanie Halfkenny as Naomi
 Bertrand E. Boyd II as Florida Man

Production 
On July 19, 2018, it was announced that production company Makeready had won a bidding war to co-finance the dramatic thriller film Queen & Slim, scripted by Lena Waithe from an original idea by James Frey, which would star Daniel Kaluuya and be directed by Melina Matsoukas. In November 2018, Jodie Turner-Smith was cast to star opposite Kaluuya. In March 2019, Chloë Sevigny joined the cast of the film.

Principal photography began in January 2019. Production concluded on March 22, 2019.

Music

The score album for Queen & Slim was composed by English musician Devonté Hynes. Choosing the score composer, Matsoukas stated she wanted a "black composer that could live between classical, hip-hop, and pop that's current", further asking "Who would be our current Quincy Jones?". Matsoukas then turned to Solange Knowles for advice, Knowles suggested Hynes.<ref>{{cite magazine|url=https://time.com/5733530/queen-and-slim-music/|title=How Queen and Slim'''s Filmmakers Captured the Past, Present and Future of Black Music|magazine=Time|first=Andrew R.|last=Chow|date=November 22, 2019|access-date=February 15, 2020}}</ref>

 Release Queen & Slim had its world premiere at the AFI Fest on November 14, 2019. It was theatrically released in the United States on November 27, 2019, by Universal Pictures. It was released in the United Kingdom in January 2020.

Reception
Box officeQueen & Slim grossed $43.8 million in the United States and Canada, and $3.9 million in other territories, for a worldwide total of $47.7 million.

In the United States and Canada, the film was released alongside Knives Out, and was projected to gross $12–16 million from 1,625 theaters over its five-day opening weekend. It made $1.7 million on its first day, Wednesday, and $2.4 million on Thursday, which was Thanksgiving Day. It went on to gross $11.9 million during its opening weekend (a five-day total of $16 million), finishing fourth at the box office. In its second weekend the film made $6.5 million (a drop of 45%), remaining in fourth.

Critical response
The site's critics consensus reads, "Stylish, provocative, and powerful, Queen & Slim tells a gripping fugitive story steeped in timely, thoughtful subtext." Metacritic, another review aggregator, assigned the film a weighted average score of 74 out of 100 based on 43 critics, indicating "generally favorable reviews." Audiences polled by CinemaScore gave the film an average grade of "A−" on an A+ to F scale, while those at PostTrak gave it an average 5 out of 5 stars, with 79% saying they would definitely recommend it.

Mark Kermode of The Guardian assigned the film four out of five stars writing: "in the end it’s the love story that makes the film matter, conjured with enough electricity to allow the polemics of the head to be swept along by the passions of the heart." Johnny Oleksinki of New York Post praised Daniel Kaluuya and Jodie Turner-Smith's lead performances. Adam White of The Independent'' labelled it "simultaneously beautiful and troubling" and praised Melina Matsoukas' directing.

Accolades

See also 
 List of black films of the 2010s

References

External links 
 
 
 AFI FEST Interview: QUEEN & SLIM Writer Lena Waithe

2019 films
2019 crime thriller films
2010s drama road movies
2019 romantic drama films
2010s romantic thriller films
American crime thriller films
American drama road movies
American romantic drama films
American romantic thriller films
Canadian crime thriller films
Canadian romantic drama films
Entertainment One films
Films about lawyers
Films about racism in the United States
Hood films
Films directed by Melina Matsoukas
Films set in Florida
Films set in New Orleans
Films set in Ohio
Films shot in New Orleans
Universal Pictures films
Bron Studios films
Works about police brutality
2010s English-language films
2010s American films
2010s Canadian films